Hosby is a village in Vormsi Parish, Lääne County, in western Estonia.

References

 

Villages in Lääne County